Cindy LaCrosse (born April 21, 1987) is an American professional golfer, currently playing on the U.S.-based LPGA Tour. She is a former member of the Futures Tour.

Personal
LaCrosse was born in Tampa, Florida on April 21, 1987, to Doug and Pam LaCrosse. Her father played college golf at the University of South Florida, and is a professional golfer. She resides in Tampa, Florida.

College
LaCrosse played college golf at the University of Louisville and earned a bachelor's degree in sports administration.

Professional
LaCrosse turned professional in 2009, and joined the Futures Tour on January 21, 2009.  She played in the final pairing in the 2011 LPGA Championship and finished tied for 14th.

Professional wins (3)

Futures Tour wins (3)

Futures Tour career summary

LPGA Tour career summary

 official through the 2022 season

References

External links

 Cindy LaCrosse at Louisville Cardinals athletics (archived)

American female golfers
Louisville Cardinals women's golfers
LPGA Tour golfers
Golfers from Tampa, Florida
1987 births
Living people